A indiscret (also known as a canapé à joue, a canapé à confidants, or a canapé à confidante)) is a type of sofa, originally characterized by a triangular seat at each end, so that people could sit at either end of the sofa and be close to the person(s) sitting in the middle.  The ends were sometimes detachable, and could be removed and used on their own as Burjair chairs.  The name Confidante was coined by cabinetmaker George Hepplewhite, who described it in his Cabinet-Maker and Upholsterer's Guide as being "of French origin, and is in pretty general request for large and spacious suits of apartments. An elegant drawing-room, with modern furniture, is scarce complete without a Confidante, […]".

References

Reference bibliography

Further reading 

 

Chairs